Elisa Aaltola (born 1976) is a Finnish philosopher, specialised in animal philosophy, moral psychology and environmental philosophy.

Biography 
She was a visiting PhD student at the Institute for Ethics, Environment, and Public Policy at Lancaster University and submitted her doctoral thesis to the University of Turku on Animal Individuality: Moral and Cultural Categorisations. Her book Eläinten moraalinen arvo (Vastapaino 2004) is considered the first commercially published Finnish monograph dedicated solely to animal ethics. She is also the author of Animal Suffering: Philosophy and Culture (Palgrave MacMillan, 2012) and Varieties of Empathy: Moral Psychology and Animal Ethics (Rowman & Littlefield Int. 2018) as well as around 40 peer-reviewed papers. Her edited volumes include "Animal Ethics and Philosophy: Questioning the Orthodoxy" (co-edited with John Hadley, Rowman & Littlefield Int. 2014).  Aaltola is an adjunct professor at the University of Turku and a research fellow at the Turku Institute for Advanced Studies (University of Turku).

Aaltola is a vegan. Her brother is Mika Aaltola, the director of the Finnish Institute of International Affairs.

Books
Me ja muut eläimet: Uusi maailmanjärjestys (ed. with Birgitta Wahlberg). Tampere: Vastapaino, 2020. .
Ihminen kaleidoskoopissa (ed. with Vilma Hänninen). Helsinki: Gaudeamus, 2020. .
Häpeä ja rakkaus: Ihmiseläinluonto . Helsinki: Into, 2019. .
Varieties of Empathy: Moral Psychology and Animal Ethics. Rowman & Littlefield Int. 2018. . 
Empatia - myötäelämisen tiede  (& Sami Keto). Helsinki: Into, 2017. .
Eläimet yhteiskunnassa (toim. Elisa Aaltola & Sami Keto). Helsinki: Into kustannus, 2015.
Animal Ethics and Philosophy: Questioning the Orthodoxy (ed. Elisa Aaltola & John Hadley). Rowman & Littlefield, 2014. .
Johdatus eläinfilosofiaan. Helsinki: Gaudeamus, 2013. .
Animal Suffering: Philosophy and Culture. Basingstone: Palgrave MacMillan, 2012. .
Animal Individuality: Cultural and Moral Categorisations, 2006. Turku: Turun yliopisto.
Eläinten moraalinen arvo. Tampere: Vastapaino, 2004. .

See also
 List of animal rights advocates

References

1976 births
21st-century Finnish philosophers
Animal welfare scholars
Animal ethicists
Finnish ethicists
Living people
Finnish women philosophers
Veganism activists
Animal rights scholars
People from Petäjävesi